Manduca janira is a moth of the  family Sphingidae. It is known from south-eastern Brazil.

It is similar in appearance to several other members of the genus Manduca, but a number of differences distinguish it from Manduca brasiliensis, to which it most closely compares, particularly in the more prominently variegated basal and apical areas of the wings and the hindwing upperside with grey bands tinted with yellow.

References

Manduca
Moths described in 1911
Taxa named by Karl Jordan